Karel  is a masculine given name in Czech, Danish, Dutch, Finnish, Icelandic, Norwegian, Slovene and Swedish form of Charles, meaning Free Man.

Given name
The name Karel (and its diminutives, Karlík, Karlíček, and Kája) appears frequently among the Czechs. In 2006, 124,784 Karels lived in the Czech Republic, making the name the thirteenth most popular Czech name. Between 1999 and 2002, the number of Karels in the Czech Republic dropped by 2.7%, and the name dropped out of the twenty most popular newborn child names. Notable people with this given name include the following:

Karel Aalbers (born 1949), Dutch businessman
Karel Abraham (born 1990), Czech motorcycle racer
Karel Ančerl (1908–1973), Czech conductor
Karel Appel (1921–2006), Dutch artist
Karel Brückner (born 1939), Czech football coach
Karel Čapek (1890–1938), Czech writer
Karel Čurda (1911–1947), Czech Nazi collaborator
Karel deLeeuw (1930–1978), American mathematician
Karel Dillen (1925–2007), Belgian politician
Karel Dobrý (born 1969), Czech actor
Karel Doorman (1889–1942), Dutch naval officer
Karel Effa (1922–1993), Czech actor 
Karel Espino (born 2001), Cuban football player
Karel Jaromír Erben (1811–1870), Czech folklorist
Karel Eykman (1936–2022), Dutch writer 
Karel Gott (1939–2019), Czech singer
Karel Guzmán (born 1995), Cuban basketball player
Karel Havlíček (1907–1988), Czech painter
Karel Havlíček Borovský (1821–1856), Czech writer and journalist
Karel Heřmánek (born 1947), Czech actor
Karel van der Hucht (born 1946), Dutch astronomer
Karel Husa (1921–2016), Czech composer and conductor
Karel Janeček (born 1973), Czech mathematician and businessman
Karel Janák (born 1970), Czech director
Karel Komárek  (born 1969), Czech businessman
Karel Marquez (born 1982), Filipino entertainer
Karel Martens (born 1939), Dutch graphic designer
Karel Poborský (born 1972), Czech football player
Karel Purkyně (1834–1868), Austro-Hungarian painter
Karel Raška (1909–1987), Czech physician and epidemiologist
Karel Reisz (1926–2002), Czech-born British filmmaker
Karel Roden (born 1962), Czech actor
Karel Schwarzenberg (born 1937), Czech politician
Karel Škréta (1610–1674), Czech painter
Karel Soucek (1947–1985), Canadian stuntman
Karel Štěpánek (1899–1980), Czech actor
 Karel Svoboda (composer) (1938–2007), Czech composer of popular music
 Karel Svoboda (artist) (1824–1870), Czech/Austrian painter
 Karel Svoboda (scientist) (born 1965), neuroscientist
 Karel Svoboda (table tennis), Czech table tennis player
Karel Urbánek (born 1941), Czech politician
Karel van Mander III (1609–1670), Dutch painter 
Karel Velebný (1931–1989), Czech musician
Karel Voolaid (born 1977), Estonian football player and manager

See also

Karey (disambiguation)
Kariel
Karol (name)
Karyl

Notes

Given names
Czech masculine given names
Danish masculine given names
Dutch masculine given names
Finnish masculine given names
Icelandic masculine given names
Norwegian masculine given names
Slovene masculine given names
Swedish masculine given names